The 1905 Spring Hill Badgers football team represented the Spring Hill College as an independent during the 1905 college football season. The season was affected by a yellow fever quarantine. "As the mosquito is now pretty well under control, there is a strong probability that next year the college eleven will not be hampered by quarantine restrictions."

Schedule

References

Spring Hill
Spring Hill Badgers football seasons
Spring Hill Badgers football